"Alright" is the first single released from American hip hop duo Kris Kross' second album, Da Bomb. The song was produced and written by Jermaine Dupri and features reggae star, Super Cat on the chorus.

Sampling Slave's "Just a Touch of Love", "Alright" was officially released on July 13, 1993, as the lead single from Da Bomb and became the album's biggest hit, peaking at #1 in Portugal, and #19 on the Billboard Hot 100 and was the duo's third single to reach #1 on the Hot Rap Singles ("Jump" and "Warm It Up" being the first two). "Alright" also contains a diss to rival group, Da Youngstas, who had been critical of Kris Kross due to their success on the Billboard charts and the fact that they did not write their lyrics. Chris Smith AKA "Daddy Mac" responded with the lyric "I didn't come out wack I came out right, unlike them moles who choose to pass da mic", an obvious reference to Da Youngstas single "Pass da Mic".

"Alright" was certified gold by the RIAA on September 14, 1993, for sales of 500,000 copies.

Critical reception
Larry Flick from Billboard commented, "What happens to an act when it starts getting too old to be precocious and cute? Kick as hard and adult as possible. Young men who wooed folks last year with "Jump" are back with deeper voices and far more worldly rhymes (which reflect some of their experiences since the onset of fame). Loping, sample-happy funk environment clicks with jazzy guitars and a spirited toasting turn by Super Cat. The road to street juice is long, but duo seems ready to take it." Troy J. Augusto from Cashbox stated that the duo "return with a much harder sound, a more street-wise theme and, yes, a more mature delivery." He added that it is a "bouncing, funky number." Tony Cross from Smash Hits gave it two out of five.

Track listing

A-Side
"Alright" (Radio Version)- 4:04 
"Alright" (LP Version)- 4:04

B-Side
"Alright" (Extended Remix)- 6:01 
"Alright" (Instrumental)- 4:04 
"DJ Nabs Break"- 1:47

Charts and certifications

Weekly charts

Year-end charts

Certifications

References

Kris Kross songs
1993 singles
Number-one singles in Portugal
Songs written by Jermaine Dupri
Song recordings produced by Jermaine Dupri
1992 songs
Ruffhouse Records singles